Giovanni Carlo Bevilacqua, also called Gian Carlo Bevilacqua (1775 – 28 August 1849) was an Italian painter.

He was born and active in Venice, Italy. He was a pupil of Lodovico Gallina and Francesco Maggiotto. He became a member of the Academy of Fine Arts of Venice. He was active in a Neoclassical style.

References

1775 births
1849 deaths
18th-century Italian painters
Italian male painters
19th-century Italian painters
Painters from Venice
Italian neoclassical painters
19th-century Italian male artists
18th-century Italian male artists